Les Hommes de bonne volonté is an epic roman-fleuve by French writer Jules Romains, published in 27 volumes between 1932 and 1946. It has been classified both as a novel cycle and a novel and, at two million words and 7,892 pages, has been cited as one of the longest novels ever written.

Plot
The volumes, written in chronological order from volume one, Le 6 octobre, through volume twenty-seven, Le 7 octobre, between them cover 6 October 1908 through 7 October 1933 in French life—an average of one volume per year, book-ended by one volume each for two particular days. The plot is expansive and features a large cast of characters, rather than narrowly focusing on individuals, but the two principals are Pierre Jallez, a poet loosely based on Romains, and Jean Jerphanion, a teacher who later goes into politics. They meet in volume 2 starting at the École Normale Supérieure and become friends. Jerphanion marries a woman named Odette and lives happily with her, while Jallez tries several times to find love and is eventually married to Françoise Mailleul. In the course of their careers, meanwhile, Jerphanion spends ten years in the Chamber of Deputies and is briefly Minister of Foreign Affairs, and Jallez finds success as a novelist, each trying to secure peace in their own way, though the First World War takes place halfway through the story, which ends with the first foreshadowings of World War II.

Structure and themes
Structurally, Men of Good Will is a roman-fleuve—a long work across several volumes with continuation of plot and related characters that may mean it forms a single novel. It has been described as a novel cycle or novel sequence, and as a novel, by different writers. Its full extent, at 2,000,000 words, across 7,892 pages, 779 chapters and 27 volumes, means it has been described as one of the longest novels ever written—sometimes the single longest.

Men of Good Will and particularly certain portions of it—Encyclopædia Britannica picks out the victory parade at the end of World War I—are emblematic of Romain's philosophy of unanimism, characterised by an interest in the collective rather than individuals. In the preface, Romains says that the ideas behind it can be traced to his very first work, La vie unanime, published in 1904. This emphasis on group spirit is, writes Harry Bergholz, partly why Men of Good Will jumps from character to character as much as it does, rather than following one thread. While characters do recur, their stories may be told discontinuously. Bergholz gives the example of Françoise Mailleul, whose birth is the subject of a chapter in volume 9 but who doesn't feature again, apart from brief reappearances in volumes 13 and 18, until her marriage to Jallez in volume 26. Rather than telling the story of a few people, Romains' aim is "to paint a complete picture of our twentieth century civilization, in all its aspects, human and inhuman, social as well as psychological". Plot threads, too, are begun, recursively interrupted, and returned to later, sometimes several volumes on. This cross-volume inter-cutting presses the reader to take the work as a whole, since plots are not always resolved within single volumes, which therefore cannot be fully understood without reference to the others.

In all, there are approximately 40 main characters but counts of the full cast vary widely, from 600 total through 1,000 to 1,600. The characters are listed at the beginning of volume 25 (Le Tapis magique). They cover all walks of life, both in terms of class and occupation, as part of attempting to depict society as a whole, though the poor are underrepresented and the bulk of the novel relates to the middle classes. Other themes of the book include marriage and friendship, the internal deviance of outwardly respectable families, Oedipal issues in father-son relationships (literal and metaphorical), Freemasonry, crime, sexual perversion, and the potential—or lack of it—for goodwill, suitably applied, to avoid collective failures such as wars. War and the struggle for peace are continuing themes throughout. The first and last volumes each feature a group of schoolchildren being lectured on the dangers of war. Jallez and Jerphanion are preoccupied with these considerations, and two volumes are dedicated to the Battle of Verdun, a key point in the narrative.

Publication

Romains began writing Men of Good Will in 1931 and announced the project in 1932. The original French publishers were Flammarion and each of the 27 volumes sold, in its first printing, at least 40,000 copies. By 1946, around 85,000 copies had been sold of the first volume. Romains wrote two volumes each year at around 600 pages between them. There were 14 volumes in the first American editions, in which publishers Alfred A. Knopf combined each of the two annual volumes into one. The Knopf editions were translated into English by Warre B. Wells (volumes 1–3) and Gerard Hopkins (volumes 4–14).

Reception
The project was widely acclaimed in France as it began but critical opinion turned against it part way through. In America, where Romains moved at the beginning of World War II, Romains and his work were spurned when it became clear how late he had continued to be in contact with Nazi figures including Joseph Goebbels.

Men of Good Will has been compared to Jean-Christophe, Romain Rolland's ten-volume French novel published between 1904 and 1912. Reviews have particularly noted the strong and rapid characterisation that Romains achieved, giving distinct personalities to each of the huge number of characters involved. Britannica describes the two volumes on Verdun, (volume 15 Prélude à Verdun and volume 16, Verdun, both published in 1938) as "remarkable visions of the soul of a world at war". Denis Saurat wrote in Modern French Literature, 1870-1940 (1946) that they are "truly an epic presentation of war". The work as a whole has been variously judged to be a "sprawling masterpiece" and "what began as a magnificent fresco of an entire generation" but degenerated "into a daguerreotype of one embittered, splenetic man".

Volumes
The French titles and their English counterparts in the Knopf editions are:

See also
 Les Misérables
 Artamène ou le Grand Cyrus
 La Comédie humaine
 À la recherche du temps perdu

Notes

References

Further reading
 
 
 The contributions by Koenraad Geldof, Murat Demirkan, Dirk Degraeve and others are dedicated to Men of Good Will

Novel sequences
1932 in literature
1946 in literature
20th-century French novels
Novels set in France
Novels set during World War I
French philosophical novels
French historical novels
Novels set in the 20th century